King Cemetery (38CH1590) is a historic African American cemetery near Adams Run, Charleston County, South Carolina, containing at least 183 graves. Oral history documents the extensive use of the graveyard during slavery and continuing into the first half of the 20th century. Distinctive characteristics include the placement of grave goods, ranging from ceramics to bottles to household furniture, on the grave and the use of plant materials as markers.

The cemetery was listed on the National Register of Historic Places in 2000.

References

African-American history of South Carolina
Cemeteries on the National Register of Historic Places in South Carolina
National Register of Historic Places in Charleston County, South Carolina